This is a list of memorials to James Monroe, the 5th president of the United States.

United States

Academic buildings
There are academic buildings named after him at the University of Mary Washington, College of William and Mary, George Mason University, and George Washington University. In addition, a statue of Monroe was dedicated in front of Tucker Hall on the campus of the College of William & Mary in 2015.

Cities, towns, or villages
Monroe, Connecticut
Monroe, Georgia
Monroe, Adams County, Indiana
Monroe, Iowa
Monroe, Louisiana
Monroe, Maine
Monroe, Massachusetts
Monroe, Michigan
Monroe, Nebraska
Monroe, New Hampshire
Monroe, New York
Monroe, North Carolina
Monroe, Ohio
Monroe, Oregon
Monroe, Pennsylvania
Monroeville, Pennsylvania
Monroe, South Dakota
Monroe, Utah
Monroe, Washington
Monroe, Wisconsin
Monroe City, Indiana
Monroe City, Missouri
Monroeville, Alabama
Monrovia, California
Old Monroe, Missouri
South Monroe, Michigan
West Monroe, Louisiana
West Monroe, Michigan
West Monroe, New York

Counties
Monroe County, Alabama
Monroe County, Arkansas
Monroe County, Florida
Monroe County, Georgia
Monroe County, Illinois
Monroe County, Indiana
Monroe County, Iowa
Monroe County, Kentucky
Monroe County, Michigan
Monroe County, Mississippi
Monroe County, Missouri
Monroe County, New York
Monroe County, Ohio
Monroe County, Pennsylvania
Monroe County, Tennessee
Monroe County, West Virginia
Monroe County, Wisconsin

Townships
Monroe Town, Adams County, Wisconsin
Monroe Town, Green County, Wisconsin
Monroe Township, Sevier County, Arkansas
Monroe Township, Mississippi County, Arkansas
Monroe Township, Ogle County, Illinois
Monroe Township, Adams County, Indiana
Monroe Township, Allen County, Indiana
Monroe Township, Carroll County, Indiana
Monroe Township, Clark County, Indiana
Monroe Township, Delaware County, Indiana
Monroe Township, Grant County, Indiana
Monroe Township, Howard County, Indiana
Monroe Township, Jefferson County, Indiana
Monroe Township, Kosciusko County, Indiana
Monroe Township, Madison County, Indiana
Monroe Township, Morgan County, Indiana
Monroe Township, Pike County, Indiana
Monroe Township, Pulaski County, Indiana
Monroe Township, Putnam County, Indiana
Monroe Township, Randolph County, Indiana
Monroe Township, Washington County, Indiana
Monroe Township, Benton County, Iowa
Monroe Township, Butler County, Iowa
Monroe Township, Fremont County, Iowa
Monroe Township, Johnson County, Iowa
Monroe Township, Linn County, Iowa
Monroe Township, Madison County, Iowa
Monroe Township, Mahaska County, Iowa
Monroe Township, Monrow County, Iowa
Monroe Township, Ringold County, Iowa
Monroe Township, Shelby County, Iowa
Monroe Township, Wayne County, Iowa
Monroe Township, Anderson County, Kansas
Monroe Charter Township, Michigan
Monroe Township, Michigan
Monroe Township, Minnesota
Monroe Township, Andrew County, Missouri
Monroe Township, Daviess County, Missouri
Monroe Township, Lincoln County, Missouri
Monroe Township, Livingston County, Missouri
Monroe Township, Monroe County, Missouri
Monroe Township, Nodaway County, Missouri
Monroe Township, Platte County, Nebraska
Monroe Township, Gloucester County, New Jersey
Monroe Township, Middlesex County, New Jersey
Monroe Township, Guilford County, North Carolina
Monroe Township, Union County, North Carolina
Monroe Township, Towner County, North Dakota
Monroe Township, Adams County, Ohio
Monroe Township, Allen County, Ohio
Monroe Township, Ashtabula County, Ohio
Monroe Township, Carroll County, Ohio
Monroe Township, Clermont County, Ohio
Monroe Township, Coshocton County, Ohio
Monroe Township, Darke County, Ohio
Monroe Township, Guernsey County, Ohio
Monroe Township, Harrison County, Ohio
Monroe Township, Henry County, Ohio
Monroe Township, Holmes County, Ohio
Monroe Township, Knox County, Ohio
Monroe Township, Licking County, Ohio
Monroe Township, Logan County, Ohio
Monroe Township, Miami County, Ohio
Monroe Township, Madison County, Ohio
Monroe Township, Muskingum County, Ohio
Monroe Township, Perry County, Ohio
Monroe Township, Pickaway County, Ohio
Monroe Township, Preble County, Ohio
Monroe Township, Putnam County, Ohio
Monroe Township, Richland County, Ohio
Monroe Township, Bedford County, Pennsylvania
Monroe Township, Bradford County, Pennsylvania
Monroe Township, Clarion County, Pennsylvania
Monroe Township, Cumberland County, Pennsylvania
Monroe Township, Juniata County, Pennsylvania
Monroe Township, Snyder County, Pennsylvania
Monroe Township, Wyoming County, Pennsylvania
Monroe Township, Turner County, South Dakota

Unincorporated communities
 Monroe City, Illinois
 Monrovia, Maryland

Other
Fort Monroe, Virginia
Lake Monroe, Florida
Lake Monroe, Indiana
Monroe College, New York 
James Monroe High School, Bronx New York
Monroe Avenue and Monroe Center Street, two major thoroughfares in downtown Grand Rapids, Michigan
Monroe North, a neighborhood and business district in Grand Rapids, Michigan
Monroe Street, New Haven, Connecticut
Mount Monroe, one of a number of mountains named for presidents of the United States in the White Mountains of New Hampshire
North Monroe Avenue, Lindenhurst, New York

Elsewhere
Monrovia, Liberia

See also
 Presidential memorials in the United States

References

Monroe
Monroe, James